David McLean may refer to:

David McLean (actor) (1922–1995), American film and television actor
David McLean (footballer, born 1884) (1884–1951), Scottish football player (Celtic, Ayr United) and manager (East Fife, Bristol Rovers, Heart of Midlothian)
David McLean (footballer, born 1890) (1890–1967), Scottish international football player
David McLean (footballer, born 1957), English footballer, played for Darlington
David McLean (rugby league), Australian rugby league player
David McLean (historian), British historian
David McLean (umpire), Scottish cricket umpire
David G. A. McLean (born 1938), chairman of the Canadian National Railway Company
David Maclean (born 1953), British politician, Member of Parliament for Penrith and The Border
David Stuart MacLean, author
David Maclean, drummer and producer for the British band Django Django
David McLean, farmer who captured in 1941 Rudolf Hess, leading member of the Nazi Party in Nazi Germany